Yuliya Lazarevna Veysberg (Yuliya Rimskaya-Korsakova) (Julia Weissberg) (b. , d. March 1, 1942) was a music critic and composer.

Life and career
Yuliya Veysberg was born in Orenburg, Russian Empire. She studied at the Women's University, and in 1912 graduated from St. Petersburg Conservatory where she studied composition under Nikolai Rimsky-Korsakov. From 1912 to 1914 she continued her studies in Berlin with Engelbert Humperdinck and Max Reger.

She married Andrey Rimsky-Korsakov, musicologist and son of Nikolai Rimsky-Korsakov, and from 1915 to 1917 served on the editorial board of the first Russian music magazine, Muzïkal'nïy sovremennik, which he founded. She died in World War II during the Siege of Leningrad conducted by Nazi German troops.

Works
Veysberg's compositions included vocal works, a symphony, a scherzo, and a fantasia. Selected works include:

At Night (symphonic poem for orchestra)
Chinese songs
Chanson d'automne: Les sanglots longs, op. 2 (Zwei Lieder) no. 1 (Text: Paul Verlaine) 
Le ciel est, par-dessus le toit, op. 2 (Zwei Lieder) no. 1 (Text: Paul Verlaine)

She also produced several operas, such as:
Русалочка (The Little Mermaid, 1923). The libretto for the opera was written by Sophia Parnok and was based on the fairy tale of the same name by Hans Christian Andersen.
'Гюльнара (Gyul'nara, 1935). The libretto for the opera was written by Sophia Parnok and was completed at the end of 1931. It was dedicated to the opera singer, Maria Maksakova. As Parnok died before production, Veysberg made final edits to the lyric before its debut in 1935.
Гуси-лебеди (Geese-Swans, 1937). The libretto for the children's opera was written by Samuil Marshak and Veysberg.
Мертвая царевна (The Dead Princess, 1937). The libretto for the radio opera was written by Alexander Pushkin.
Зайкин дом (A Little Rabbit's House, 1937). The libretto for the children's opera was written by W. Weltmann.

References

1880 births
1942 deaths
20th-century classical composers
Musicians from the Russian Empire
Soviet composers
Women classical composers
Jewish composers
Victims of the Siege of Leningrad
Soviet Jews
People from Orenburg
20th-century women composers